New states may refer to:

Creating new sovereign states (countries)
List of proposed state mergers to create new sovereign states
Lists of active separatist movements
List of historical separatist movements

Creating new administrative subdivisions within countries
51st state, possible new states in the United States
List of U.S. state partition proposals
New states of Germany, five German states recreated in 1990
List of proposed states of Australia
List of proposed provinces and territories of Canada
List of proposed states and territories of India

See also
Estado Novo (disambiguation)
State (disambiguation)
New (disambiguation)
New Land (disambiguation)
New Country (disambiguation)
New areas of the People's Republic of China (special economic new urban zones)
New Territories, Hong Kong, China
New Territory, Texas